Connie Alexander may refer to 

 Connie Alexander (youth hostelling) (1897–1979), British pioneer of youth hostelling
 Connie Alexander (sportscaster) (1929–2019), US sports broadcaster
 Constantine Alexander (born 1950), British judoka